Jay Pil Choi is the University Distinguished Professor of Economics at Michigan State University and also a published author of works and books.

Early life and career
Choi graduated from Seoul National University in Economics in 1982, and received his Ph.D. at Harvard University in 1990. He served as an associate professor at Columbia University and Seoul National University before moving to Michigan State University in 2000.  In 2015, he held the Distinguished Visiting Professorship at Hitotsubashi University.

Works
As an author, he is largely held in libraries worldwide, with his current highest book being published MIT Press.

References

American economists
Michigan State University faculty
Harvard Graduate School of Arts and Sciences alumni
American business writers
South Korean emigrants to the United States
Seoul National University alumni
Living people
Year of birth missing (living people)